Abebu Gelan Adugna (born 18 January 1990) is an Ethiopian female long-distance runner who competes mainly in road running competitions. She has represented Ethiopia three times internationally, competing as a junior at the IAAF World Cross Country Championships in 2007, then twice as a senior at the IAAF World Half Marathon Championships (2008, 2009). She was a team gold medallist at the 2008 World Half Marathon. Her half marathon best of 67:57 minutes was achieved in 2009. This time was a world junior best for the distance.

She won the Agadir Half Marathon and Cross de l'Acier races in 2008, then had further wins in 2009 in North America at the Rock 'n' Roll Virginia Beach Half Marathon and Vancouver Sun Run. Her best half marathon race came at the RAK Half Marathon in 2009, where she was fourth. In 2009, she also had top three finishes at the Azalea Trail Run and Crescent City Classic. After a break in competition, she returned in 2013 with a focus on longer distances. She failed to match her previous performances at 10K and the half marathon and instead made progress in the marathon, having a winning debut at the Belgrade Marathon with a run of 2:33:14 hours. She was runner-up on her next outing at the Košice Peace Marathon but returned to the top of the podium at the 2016 Brescia Marathon.

International competitions

Circuit wins
Brescia Marathon: 2016
Belgrade Marathon: 2015
Rock 'n' Roll Virginia Beach Half Marathon: 2009
Vancouver Sun Run: 2009
Agadir Half Marathon: 2008
Cross de l'Acier: 2008

Personal bests
10K run – 32:04 min (2008)
Half marathon – 1:07:57 (2009)
Marathon – 2:33:14 (2015)

References

External links

Living people
1990 births
Ethiopian female long-distance runners
Ethiopian female marathon runners
Ethiopian female cross country runners
20th-century Ethiopian women
21st-century Ethiopian women